Bodies Bodies Bodies is a 2022 American black comedy horror film directed by Halina Reijn, in her English-language debut, with a screenplay by Sarah DeLappe from a story by Kristen Roupenian. It stars Amandla Stenberg, Maria Bakalova, Myha'la Herrold, Chase Sui Wonders, Rachel Sennott, Lee Pace, and Pete Davidson.

Bodies Bodies Bodies premiered at South by Southwest on March 14, 2022, and was theatrically released in the United States on August 5, 2022, by A24. The film received generally positive reviews from critics, who praised the humor and the cast's performances, particularly Sennott's.

Plot
Bee, a working-class young woman from Eastern Europe, travels with her wealthy girlfriend Sophie to a "hurricane party" at a mansion owned by the family of David, Sophie's friend. Other guests include David's actress girlfriend Emma, podcaster Alice, her much-older new boyfriend Greg, and enigmatic Jordan. Max, another guest, left after a fight with David the night before Sophie and Bee arrived. 

After drinking, using drugs, and dancing, the group decides to play "Bodies Bodies Bodies", a murder in the dark-style game. Greg goes to bed early due to hostility throughout the game from David, who also leaves soon after another fight with Emma. As the storm worsens, the power goes out and the girls scramble to find a power source. Minutes later, Bee finds David outside with his throat slashed, a blood-stained kukri nearby. Panicked and without reception, the group try to go for help in Sophie's car, but find its battery dead.

The group discovers Greg has a go bag with a knife and a map of the area and become suspicious of him. They fearfully confront Greg, who returns their hostility. After a struggle, Bee bludgeons him to death with a kettle bell in self defense.

The group doubt that Greg was the killer and Emma theorizes that Max, who had confessed feelings for her the night before, returned to kill David. Sophie, a sober addict, relapses. Emma kisses her, to Sophie's confusion, before accepting drugs. Alice later finds Emma dead from a head wound at the bottom of the stairs, and believes the group is being killed one by one. Jordan and Alice cast suspicion on Bee, revealing that no one with her name is on record as having graduated from her college; they cast Bee out into the hurricane.

Returning to Sophie's car, Bee finds underwear that matches Jordan's bra in the backseat. She sees Jordan holding David's father's gun through a window, then crawls back inside through a pet door. Bee confronts the group, revealing that she dropped out of college to take care of her mother, who has borderline personality disorder. A vicious verbal fight ensues between the group. Jordan, who was the "killer" in the Bodies Bodies Bodies game, reveals resentment for Sophie due to her drug addiction and using David to regain access to her trust fund, and claims Sophie cheated on Bee with her, which Sophie denies. Sophie expresses why she would not date Jordan, that she avoids her friends because their behavior challenges her sobriety, and reveals that Jordan only "hate-listens" to Alice's podcast. After Alice responds by insulting Jordan's insecurities, Jordan shoots Alice in the leg. A struggle for the gun follows; Alice is fatally shot in the throat. As Sophie and Jordan fight, Bee pushes Jordan over the staircase bannister. With her dying breath, Jordan tells Bee to check Sophie's text messages. Bee hides from Sophie out of distrust.

When morning comes and the storm has blown over, Sophie tearfully confesses to Bee that she relapsed and witnessed Emma tripping and falling down the stairs to her death. However, Bee holds her at gunpoint, demanding to see her texts. Sophie tosses her phone away and they struggle, inadvertently picking up David's phone in the process, which shows that David accidentally slashed his own throat while trying to use the kukri to open a champagne bottle for a TikTok video—revealing there was no real murderer after all. As Bee and Sophie realize the bloodshed was all for nothing, a confused Max returns to the mansion, and the power comes back on.

Cast
 Amandla Stenberg as Sophie
 Maria Bakalova as Bee
 Myha'la Herrold as Jordan
 Chase Sui Wonders as Emma
 Rachel Sennott as Alice
 Lee Pace as Greg
 Pete Davidson as David
 Conner O'Malley as Max

Production
In March 2018, A24 acquired Bodies, Bodies, Bodies, a spec script written by Kristen Roupenian. In September 2019, it was announced Chloe Okuno would re-write the script and direct the film. In April 2021, it was reported that Amandla Stenberg and Maria Bakalova were set to star in the film, while Pete Davidson and Myha'la Herrold were in talks to join the cast, with Halina Reijn now set to direct. Bakalova said she was scared to be in a horror film, having been frightened watching them, but thought that A24 films were deeper; she said that the film was "more like an R-rated comedy." In May 2021, actors Lee Pace, Rachel Sennott, Chase Sui Wonders, and Conner O'Malley joined the film, with Davidson and Herrold's casting also being confirmed.

Principal photography began in May 2021, with filming taking place at a Georgian stone manor house in Chappaqua, New York.

Ultimately, Roupenian was given a "Story by" credit for her work on the film's screenplay, while The Wolves playwright Sarah DeLappe received sole, final "Screenplay by" credit.

Music
The film's music score was composed by Disasterpeace in March 2022. Charli XCX performed the song "Hot Girl" for the film, which was released as a single on July 26, 2022. The 9-music scores album was released on August 10, 2022, by A24 Music. Meghan Currier was credited as the music supervisor for the film, which contains 15 credited songs from a wide variety of artists including Shygirl, Kilo Kish, Princess Nokia, Azealia Banks and Tommy Genesis. The music selection features a heavy prominence of female rappers and singer-songwriters.

Themes and influences

Bodies Bodies Bodies has been described as a "satire on class and privilege, all mediated by new technology, the language of progressive politics and youth culture, and Gen Z identity itself". In a piece for The New York Times, Kalia Richardson writes that the film satirizes Gen-Z’s symbiotic relationship with their cellphones and the internet, using dark humor to illustrate what happens when those two things became inaccessible: "when the Wi-Fi goes out, it’s like they lose oxygen", remarks director Halina Reijn . Richardson notes that despite "the physical danger each character faces, their virtual realities remain central to the plot", recalling the characters' inability to relate to each other in person without the use of the "trauma-centered" jargon of social media such as "gaslight", "trigger", and "toxic".

Several critics noted the influence of Agatha Christie or specifically her 1939 mystery novel And Then There Were None on the film. In an interview with Vice, director Halina Reijn cited the many films that influenced Bodies Bodies Bodies, such as Heathers (1988), Don's Plum (2001), Who's Afraid of Virginia Woolf? (1966), The Piano Teacher (2001), Cries and Whispers (1972), and the filmography of John Cassavetes.

Release
Bodies Bodies Bodies premiered at South by Southwest on March 14, 2022. It was theatrically released on August 5, 2022, in select cities, before a nationwide expansion on August 12. Sony Pictures Releasing distributed the film internationally via the Stage 6 Films banner.

The film was released on VOD on September 27, 2022, followed by release on Blu-ray and DVD on October 18, 2022.

Reception

Box office 
In its opening weekend, Bodies Bodies Bodies made $226,653 from six theaters in Los Angeles and New York City. The $37,775 per-venue average was the second best of 2022 for a limited release, behind Everything Everywhere All at Once ($50,130 in March). The film expanded to 1,283 theaters in its second weekend, and was projected to gross $2–3 million. It made $3.1 million, finishing eighth at the box office. Expanding to 2,541 theaters in its third weekend, the film made $2.6 million, finishing tenth. It made $1.1 million the next weekend, finishing fourteenth.

Critical response 
On the review aggregator website Rotten Tomatoes, 85% of 226 reviews are positive, with an average rating of 7/10. The website's critical consensus reads, "Impeccably cast and smartly written, Bodies Bodies Bodies is an uncommonly well-done whodunnit." Metacritic, which uses a weighted average, assigned a score of 69 out of 100 based on 43 critics, indicating "generally favorable reviews." Audiences polled by PostTrak gave the film an average 3 out of 5 stars, with 63% saying they would definitely recommend it.

Abby Olcese for RogerEbert.com praised the use of music and cinematography to enhance the single-location setting. Bloody Disgusting found the social satire of the movie, and its use of setting to highlight this, to be strong. Lovia Gyarkye for The Hollywood Reporter found the film to be a psychological study of the friendship archetypes and the digital age, while also showing an understanding of the anxieties of twenty-somethings, praising the story. IndieWire's Robert Daniels wrote that Reijn's direction was the strongest part of the film, while also praising the script for its social interrogation. Erin Brady of Little White Lies instead thought that the film fell apart towards the end because it is "a movie that claims to understand how Gen-Z treats societal topics ... [while] portraying some of those topics so stereotypically." However, she said that the film was well-paced and it was hard to resist the fun of it. IGNs Rafael Motamayor wrote that "it does falter somewhat when it comes to Gen Z talk ... like someone had a bunch of placeholders they swapped in with whatever term a teenager told them kids use these days," though also felt it was good overall.

Valerie Complex at Deadline Hollywood praised the cast, saying "each actor [has] their own style that brings a varied flavor to the film, which makes the cast ... a joy to watch, even if their characters are insufferable," and Owen Gleiberman for Variety praised the directing for giving the characters and actors room to explore. Complex and Daniels said that the characters as written are weak, but the performances all elevate them. Sennott was consistently named the standout performance of the film, while Brady said this was Herrold's. Gyarkye wrote that nobody could deny the acting talent, noting Herrold as well as Stenberg. Daniels highlighted Sennott and Davidson, while Marya E. Gates of The Playlist commended the ensemble while noting Davidson and Bakalova. Paste Aurora Amidon felt that the cast were all successful, but that Bakalova's comedic talents were wasted by playing a serious character.

Gleiberman described the film as "And Then There Were None staged by John Cassavetes for the age of Instagram." Gates felt that some scenes ran too long, but said that the film is "destined to [take] its place on the mantle with seminal horror-comedy faves like Jennifer's Body and Scream;" Gyarkye instead said that the film may not appeal to slasher genre fans. Eileen Jones of Jacobin gave a negative review of the film, summarizing: "Like so many horror films attempting to be subversive, Bodies Bodies Bodies tries to satirize the upper class. But all it delivers are tired, lazy tropes about Gen Z."

References

External links
 

2022 black comedy films
2022 comedy horror films
2022 LGBT-related films
2020s American films
2020s English-language films
2020s satirical films
A24 (company) films
American black comedy films
American comedy horror films
American satirical films
Films about social media
Films set in country houses
Films shot in New York (state)
LGBT-related black comedy films
LGBT-related comedy horror films